Agaram is a panchayat town in Dindigul district, Tamil Nadu, India.

Geography
It has an average elevation of 297 metres (974 feet).

Demographics
By the 2001 census of India, Agaram had a population of 12,784. Males constitute 50% of the population and females 50%. Agaram has an average literacy rate of 58%, lower than the national average of 59.5%; with 58% of the males and 42% of females literate. 11% of the population is under 6 years of age.

References

See also
 Govindavadi

Cities and towns in Dindigul district